The Rock is the third album from Frankie Miller, and the only one officially credited to The Frankie Miller Band. The album features backing from The Memphis Horns and The Edwin Hawkins Singers.

The album was recorded in sight of the prison of Alcatraz in San Francisco, Miller commented that it was only music that had saved him that kind of fate and dedicated the song, The Rock, to the plight of prisoners, a reference to his second cousin Jimmy Boyle.

"Ain't Got No Money" became the album’s most covered song with notable versions from Cher, Chris Farlowe and Bob Seger. The song, "Drunken Nights in the City", was written for his late-night drinking buddy Jimmy Johnstone, the former (Celtic FC) Scottish footballer.  Etta James covered the song A Fool in Love for her 1990 album, Stickin' to My Guns. "A Fool in Love" was also covered by UFO.

Track listing

Personnel
Musicians
Frankie Miller - vocals, rhythm guitar
Henry McCullough - lead guitar, backing vocals
Mick Weaver - keyboards
Chrissy Stewart - bass guitar
Stu Perry - drums, percussion
James Dewar - backing vocals
The Memphis Horns - horn section
The Edwin Hawkins Singers - backing vocals

Production credits
Produced by Elliot Mazer
Engineered by Jeremy Zatkin, Elliot Mazer
Recorded at His Master's Wheels, San Francisco

References

1975 albums
Frankie Miller albums
Albums produced by Elliot Mazer
Chrysalis Records albums